Philippe Renault (born 26 June 1959) is a French former racing driver.

References

1959 births
Living people
French racing drivers
French Formula Renault 2.0 drivers
FIA European Formula 3 Championship drivers
24 Hours of Le Mans drivers